Helisoma anceps, common name the two-ridge rams-horn, is a species of air-breathing freshwater snail, a pulmonate gastropod mollusk in the family Planorbidae, the ram's horn snails.

Distribution
This species is distributed from Mexico, through the Central United States, to central Canada.

It was introduced to Europe.

See also
List of non-marine molluscs of Mexico
List of non-marine molluscs of the United States
List of non-marine mollusks of the Indiana Dunes

References

Further reading 
 Turgeon D. D., et al. (1998). Common and scientific names of aquatic invertebrates of the United States and Canada. American Fisheries Society Special Publication 26

External links 

Planorbidae
Molluscs of North America
Molluscs of Canada
Molluscs of Mexico
Molluscs of the United States
Fauna of the Great Lakes region (North America)
Fauna of the Plains-Midwest (United States)
Gastropods described in 1830